Kilkenny is a township in Coös County, New Hampshire, United States. It lies entirely within the White Mountain National Forest. As of the 2020 census, the township had a population of zero.

In New Hampshire, locations, grants, townships (which are different from towns), and purchases are unincorporated portions of a county which are not part of any town and have limited self-government (if any, as many are uninhabited).

History 

The town was granted to Jonathan Warner and others on June 4, 1774, containing . It was named after the town and county of Kilkenny in Ireland.

Kilkenny once included a large portion of what is now the eastern edge of Jefferson, tapering south into the area of Jefferson Notch at the foot of Mount Mitten. This included much of the area known as "Jefferson Highland" on the Portland Road (present-day U.S. Route 2). By the 1870s, maps were showing the southern edge of Kilkenny as a line extending the border between Jefferson and Lancaster. The 1896 topographic map, however, shows that the boundary had again been adjusted several miles south, to include Mount Waumbek and Pliny Mountain, uninhabited areas. Deeds in this area often refer to the "Kilkenny Addition".

On the 1935 topographic map, the "Upper Ammonoosuc Trail" crossed Kilkenny along Priscilla Brook and through the pass from the Keenan Brook area of Randolph, north of Pliny Mountain. This trail has since been abandoned, although a 2002 atlas of New Hampshire shows a "Priscilla Brook Trail" in the same location.

The Willard Bowl north of Mount Waumbek, drained by Garland Brook, was considered as a site for development of a ski area in 1971, when it was owned by former governor Hugh Gregg. By 1935, the tracks were gone.

Geography 

The township is entirely within the Connecticut River watershed. The southern end of the township, as well as the west side of the Pilot Range, drain west via Fox Brook, Bunnell Brook, Garland Brook, and Priscilla Brook to the Israel River, which joins the Connecticut at Lancaster, while the northern end of the township, including the east side of the Pilot Range and its north end, drain to the Upper Ammonoosuc River, which flows north and west to join the Connecticut at Groveton.

Kilkenny is bordered to the south and west by Jefferson, to the west by Lancaster, to the north by Stark, and to the east by Berlin and Milan. The West Branch of the Upper Ammonoosuc River originates on the eastern slope of the Pilot Range.

Demographics 

As of the 2020 census, there were no people living in the township.

Sources 
 Town of Jefferson. Jefferson, New Hampshire, Before 1996 (1995). Littleton: Sherwin Dodge. p. 103.

References

External links
 1896 Topographic map segment

Townships in Coös County, New Hampshire
Berlin, New Hampshire micropolitan area
Townships in New Hampshire